Mikael Olander (born 11 June 1963) is a retired decathlete from Sweden, who finished in 17th place (7869 points) at the 1988 Summer Olympics in Seoul, South Korea. He is a one-time national champion (1986) in the men's decathlon.

Olander was a member of the Louisiana State University track and field team.

Achievements

References
 
 1988 Year List

1963 births
Living people
Swedish decathletes
Athletes (track and field) at the 1988 Summer Olympics
LSU Tigers track and field athletes
Olympic athletes of Sweden